Mamak Futbol Kulübü, formerly known as Başkent Akademi Futbol Kulübü and BAKspor, is a Turkish professional football club located in Mamak, Ankara.

History 
The team was established as Egospor in the year 1984. The name was changed to Bugsaş S.K. in 2005. In 2012, Polatlı Bugsaşspor became the new name, lasting one season before changing to Bugsaşspor. In December 2018, the club changed its name to Başkent Akademi FK. They previously played at the OSTİM Stadium in Sincan, the outer borough of Ankara where they were known as the Sincan Kaplanları, or Sincan Tigers.

References

External links
Mamak FK on TFF.org

Football clubs in Ankara
2021 establishments in Turkey
Association football clubs established in 2021